Federica Del Buono (born 12 December 1994) is an Italian middle-distance runner who competes mainly in track events. She was the bronze medallist in the 1500 metres at the European Athletics Indoor Championships in 2015. She has a personal best of 4:05.32 minutes for the event. She won the 2014 Italian national title and represented Italy at the 2014 European Athletics Championships. She competed at the 2020 Summer Olympics, in the 1500 m.

Her parents Gianni Del Buono and Rossella Gramola were also two middle-distance runners.

Career

Born in Vicenza, Del Buono began training with her mother as coach and became a member of the Gruppo Sportivo Forestale sports club. Early in her life, she was more interested in dance, but began taking part in athletics in seriousness around 2011. She soon rose to prominence nationally and competed in the heats of the 1500 metres at the 2012 World Junior Championships in Athletics. Del Buono also ran over 4 km at the 2012 European Cross Country Championships, finishing 40th overall.

She won her first international medal at the inaugural 1500 m at the 2014 Mediterranean Athletics U23 Championships, beating Olympic medallist Gamze Bulut to the gold medal. A fourth place in senior competition followed at the 2014 European Team Championships Super League. She went on to be selected for the 1500 m at the 2014 European Athletics Championships, where she placed fifth in a personal best of 4:07.49 minutes. She won her first national title in the 1500 m at that year's Italian Athletics Championships.

The twenty-year-old Del Buono won her first senior medal at the 2015 European Athletics Indoor Championships. Competing over her specialty 1500 m, she took a clear third place for the bronze medal with a run of 4:11.61 minutes.

Personal bests
Outdoor
800 metres – 2:00.58 (2014)
1500 metres – 4:05.32 (2014)
3000 metres – 9:01.38 (2014)
Indoor
1500 metres – 4:08.87 (2015)
3000 metres – 9:01.19 (2015)
All information from IAAF.

Achievements

National titles
Italian Athletics Championships
1500 metres: 2014

See also
 Italian all-time top lists - 800 m
 Italian all-time top lists - 1500 m

References

External links

Living people
1994 births
Italian female middle-distance runners
Sportspeople from Vicenza
Athletics competitors of Centro Sportivo Carabinieri
Athletes (track and field) at the 2020 Summer Olympics
Olympic athletes of Italy
20th-century Italian women
21st-century Italian women
Athletes (track and field) at the 2022 Mediterranean Games
Mediterranean Games silver medalists for Italy
Mediterranean Games medalists in athletics